Creston High School opened in 1923 as Creston Junior High School, with its first class graduating in 1927.   This school was one of the five high schools in Grand Rapids, Michigan.  At its peak, it housed around one thousand students and over fifty teachers making the teacher to student ratio about 1:20.  The school mascot was the polar bear. The colors were blue and gold.

Closure
In 2012 the district administration proposed closure of Creston, on the basis of an enrollment decrease, as part of a plan to shutter ten campuses. Monica Scott of MLive wrote that "biggest push back has come from closing Creston High School."

As part of a realignment among Grand Rapids Public Schools high schools, Creston was consolidated with Grand Rapids Central High School.  The consolidated high school kept the Grand Rapids Central High School name and location.  Students who lived too far from Grand Rapids Central's location have been allowed to attend the high school nearest their neighborhood, including Grand Rapids City High-Middle School which moved into the former Creston High School building.  The realignment took place for the 2013–14 school year.

Campus
The building could house 1,397 students.

Demographics
In 2012 the school had 650 students. 56% did not come from the northeast part of Grand Rapids, where the school was located.

Notable alumni
 Cameron Bradfield - football offensive tackle who played for NFL's Jacksonville Jaguars
 Carlton Brewster - football wide receiver who played for NFL's Browns, Packers, Chargers, Broncos, and Saints
 Chuck F. DeShane - football player who played for Detroit Lions from 1945 to 1949, after he coached football at Creston from 1942 to 1944
 Jim Command - former Major League Baseball player for Philadelphia Phillies
 Sparky McEwen - football quarterback and head football coach for Creston from 1996 to 2003, winning three city league titles and school's first appearance in the state championship game
 Scott S. Haraburda - U.S. Army Colonel and former president of Indiana Society of Professional Engineers
 Doug Meijer - co-chairman of supermarket Meijer
 Hank Meijer - co-chairman and CEO of supermarket Meijer
 Roger W. Wilkins - Pulitzer Prize-winning journalist and African-American civil rights leader

References

External links
  - Grand Rapids Public Schools
 Creston High School, History of Grand Rapids

Schools in Grand Rapids, Michigan
Public high schools in Michigan
Educational institutions established in 1923
1923 establishments in Michigan